is Sachi Tainaka's eighth single. It was released on July 23, 2008. This is the singer's first cover song to date. "Nettaiya" is the only original song in this single. "Ai ga Areba Daijoubu" is also a Kohmi Hirose cover song but it is a ballad version of the original.

The CD's catalog number is GNCX-0014.

Track listing
Mou Kiss Sarechatta
Composition/Lyrics: Hirose Kohmi
Arrangement: Atsushi Yuasa
Nettaiya
Composition/Lyrics: Sachi Tainaka
Arrangement: Masao Doi
Ai ga Areba Daijoubu
Composition/Lyrics: Hirose Kohmi
Arrangement: Atsushi Yuasa
Mou Kiss Sarechatta -instrumental-
Nettaiya -instrumental-

References

2008 singles
Sachi Tainaka songs
Songs written by Kohmi Hirose
Year of song missing